New Marion is an unincorporated community in Shelby Township, Ripley County, in the U.S. state of Indiana.

History
New Marion was laid out in 1832. The community's name most likely honors Francis Marion. A post office was established at New Marion in 1833, and remained in operation until it was discontinued in 1949.

Geography

References

Unincorporated communities in Ripley County, Indiana
Unincorporated communities in Indiana